Barbora Špotáková (born 30 June 1981) is a former Czech track and field athlete who competed in the javelin throw. She is a two-time Olympic Champion and three-time World Champion, as well as the current world record holder with a throw of 72.28 m.

Career
Špotáková was a heptathlete in her early career, finishing fourth at the 2000 World Junior Championships. She also won the International Combined Events Meeting in Hexham in 2000 before she went on to study in the USA and specialise in Javelin throwing. She was an All-American during her one season at the University of Minnesota in 2001-02, and won the silver medal at the 2006 European Championships in Gothenburg.

Špotáková improved the Czech national record (previously 66.21 m held by herself since 2006) twice in the final of the 2007 World Championships in Osaka. She took an early lead for 66.40 m in the first attempt and secured the gold medal in the third attempt (67.07 m) before German Christina Obergföll (66.46 m). Špotáková became the seventh woman in the world to reach the 67 m mark. At the 2008 Olympics, she won the gold medal, taking the lead with her last throw, 71.42 m, which set a new European record. At the 2008 IAAF World Athletics Final on 13 September 2008, Špotáková broke the world record in the first round to win the competition with a throw of 72.28 m.

Until the end of the 2010 season she was coached by Rudolf Černý, who led her from a national elite level heptathlete to the World Record in the Women's Javelin. Prior to the 2011 season it was announced that Jan Železný would take over as her coach.
At the end of 2010 she won the Czech federation's annual poll for "Athlete of the year" for the fourth year in a row.  Then she won it again in 2011, making it five years in a row. She won her second Olympic gold medal at the 2012 London Olympics.

Špotáková gave birth to a son in May 2013 and did not compete at the world championships in Moscow later that year. In 2014, she won the European Championships in Zürich, Switzerland with a throw of 64.41 m.

Špotáková reunited with her former coach Rudolf Černý in 2015 to train for the Olympic Games in Rio de Janeiro in 2016, where she won the bronze medal with a throw of 64.80m.

On 9 September 2022 Špotáková announced her retirement from professional sport.

Personal life
Špotáková was born in Jablonec nad Nisou, later she moved to Prague. Since 2014, she has been living in Unhošť.

Achievements

Notes

References

External links

 
 
 

1981 births
Living people
Czech female javelin throwers
Athletes (track and field) at the 2004 Summer Olympics
Athletes (track and field) at the 2008 Summer Olympics
Athletes (track and field) at the 2012 Summer Olympics
Athletes (track and field) at the 2016 Summer Olympics
Athletes (track and field) at the 2020 Summer Olympics
Olympic athletes of the Czech Republic
Olympic gold medalists for the Czech Republic
Olympic bronze medalists for the Czech Republic
World Athletics record holders
European Athletics Championships winners
Medalists at the 2012 Summer Olympics
Medalists at the 2008 Summer Olympics
Medalists at the 2016 Summer Olympics
Sportspeople from Jablonec nad Nisou
World Athletics Championships athletes for the Czech Republic
Olympic gold medalists in athletics (track and field)
Olympic bronze medalists in athletics (track and field)
Universiade medalists in athletics (track and field)
Olympic female javelin throwers
Universiade gold medalists for the Czech Republic
World Athletics Championships winners
Diamond League winners
IAAF Continental Cup winners
Czech Athletics Championships winners
Medalists at the 2005 Summer Universiade